Karachi Rugby Football Club  is a Pakistani rugby club in Karachi.

History
The club was founded in 1926, making it the oldest rugby club in Pakistan.

References

Rugby clubs established in 1926
Pakistani rugby union teams
Sport in Karachi